Oakville, Manitoba is an unincorporated community recognized as a local urban district in Manitoba. It is located in the Rural Municipality of Portage la Prairie.

Demographics 

References 

Designated places in Manitoba
Local urban districts in Manitoba
Unincorporated communities in Westman Region